The five dollar coin is the second-highest denomination coin of the Hong Kong dollar. It replaced the five dollar banknotes in 1976.

It was first issued as a 10-sided coin in 1976, under British rule. The coin was also made of copper-nickel but weighed 10.76 grams, was 31 mm in diameter and 2.08 mm thick. The obverse featured Arnold Machin's portrait of Queen Elizabeth II and the inscription Queen Elizabeth II. Its reverse featured a crowned British lion and the year of minting, as well as the country's name and the coin's denomination in both English and Chinese.

In 1980, the current round coin was issued, being slightly smaller and heavier. This coin replaced the lion on the reverse with a number five, but retained Machin's portrait. In 1985, the portrait of the Queen was changed to the one by Raphael Maklouf, introduced to British coins in the same year.

In 1993, the image of the Queen on the obverse was replaced by a Bauhinia flower. Since that year, the flower features on all of Hong Kong's coins in circulation. The name of the country in both English and Chinese has been moved onto the obverse.

A commemorative issue was released in 1997 to commemorate the handover of Hong Kong to China from the United Kingdom. It had five bats of happiness on the reverse, surrounding the shou character of longevity. The date was split on each side of the character and the denomination moved to the top.

Mintage

References

Sources

 Ma Tak Wo 2004, Illustrated Catalogue of Hong Kong Currency, Ma Tak Wo Numismatic Co., LTD Kowloon Hong Kong. 

Notes

Coins of Hong Kong
Five-base-unit coins